Serge Racine (born 9 October 1951) is a Haitian football defender who played for Haiti in the 1974 FIFA World Cup. He also played for Aigle Noir AC and Wacker 04 Berlin in Germany.

References

External links
 

1951 births
Living people
Haitian footballers
Haitian expatriate footballers
Haiti international footballers
Association football defenders
1974 FIFA World Cup players
Aigle Noir AC players
Wacker 04 Berlin players
Ligue Haïtienne players
2. Bundesliga players
Expatriate footballers in Germany
Haitian expatriate sportspeople in Germany